Rudak (also Romanized as Rūdak) is a village in Kamaraj Rural District, Kamaraj and Konartakhteh District, Kazerun County, Fars Province, Iran. At the 2006 census, its population was 17, in 5 families.

References 

Populated places in Kazerun County